Karizak-e Nagahani (also Romanized as Kārīzak-e Nāgahānī; also known as Kahrīzak, Kārīzak, Kārīzak-e Khūjavī, Kārīzak-e Nāgahān, and Kārīzak-e Nāghānī) is a village in Zaveh Rural District, in the Central District of Zaveh County, Razavi Khorasan Province, Iran. At the 2006 census, its population was 2,821, in 684 families.

References 

Populated places in Zaveh County